Bradley Bellick is a fictional character from the American television series, Prison Break. He is portrayed by Wade Williams. As one of the principal characters of Prison Break, he has been featured in the first four seasons of the series. The character was introduced in the series' pilot as Captain Brad Bellick, the leader of the correctional officers at Fox River State Penitentiary. Originally, he was the main antagonist of Michael Scofield and the escape team. In the second season, the character's role changes as the main plot moves away from the prison setting, which allows him to remain as one of the main characters in the series. While not possessing the educational rigour as Scofield or Agent Mahone, he has shown himself to be highly cunning and even been able to outsmart Scofield on numerous occasions and he must not be underestimated, and in Season 2 was able to track down several of the Fox River escapees and travel across America on a low budget. In season three, he is a prisoner in the Panamanian prison, Sona. In season four, Bellick became a member of Scofield's team dedicated to locating Scylla, but sacrificed his life to protect their mission.

Background

From a young age Brad Bellick had wanted to be a police officer, but being turned down by the police academy after trying and failing the entrance exam five times, he resorted to taking a job as a correctional officer. He was employed at Fox River shortly after graduating high school and remained there until his termination during the episode "Otis" in season 2. Due to his belief that punishment is the primary purpose of prison and not rehabilitation, he and Warden Henry Pope (played by Stacy Keach) do not always agree on several issues. Nevertheless, Warden Pope continues to give him more responsibility with the intention of having Bellick succeed him as warden when he retires. Bellick has a history of corruption and inmate abuse, and as described by his ex-colleague, Bellick is as "crooked as scoliosis", referring to his corruption as a guard at Fox River. Upon the incarceration of John Abruzzi (Peter Stormare), who was a mobster prior to his imprisonment, Bellick arranged a deal with him that in exchange for monthly payments, Abruzzi would have control of Prison Industries (PI). Additionally, it is revealed in the flashback episode, "Brother's Keeper", that Bellick is a recovering substance abuser and is infatuated with Sara Tancredi (Sarah Wayne Callies), the prison doctor. Bellick is about 40 years old, judging from his own words in "The Killing Box."

Appearances

Season 1 

In the pilot episode of the show, Bellick forms an immediate dislike of the newly arrived inmate Michael Scofield (Wentworth Miller). Believing that he is a "smart ass", Bellick goes to great lengths to harass Michael or investigate his actions. Throughout the first season, Bellick serves as Michael's primary antagonist inside the prison, and constantly attempts to give him trouble at every chance he gets. Learning in the episode "Allen", that Michael has earned the favor of Warden Pope, Bellick is strengthened in his dislike of Michael and later arranges for a mentally unstable inmate called Haywire to become Scofield's cellmate. As the season unfolds, Bellick's relationship with Warden Pope becomes somewhat strained as well; following a major riot in "Riots, Drills and the Devil", Bellick disagrees with Pope's lenient methods and earns his boss’ ire after Bellick disrespects Pope in front of the Governor, Frank Tancredi. The character shows his first hint of humanity, however, in "The Old Head" where he is devastated over the death of a guard that was murdered in the riots. When Charles Westmoreland (Muse Watson), who knows who the murderer is, is too afraid to reveal it, Bellick is outraged and strangles Westmoreland's cat as revenge.

In a later episode, due to her visit to Fox River and her connection with Michael, Bellick goes to search for Nika Volek (Holly Valance) and finds her at a club he frequents. After finding out about Michael's deal with Nika, Bellick attempts to find the credit card she smuggled in but fails to find it and has to settle with trying to agitate Michael by insulting Nika. Bellick becomes increasingly curious about what Michael is up to as the season progresses. After he fails to find out anything further, Bellick approaches the inmate Tweener in the episode "Odd Man Out" and forces him to become an informant. Bellick role continues to revolve around Michael and his possible activities in the second half of the season. In "The Rat", he is able to sabotage Michael's efforts to postpone his brother's execution by tampering with the electric chair, and in the episode "J-Cat", Bellick uses Tweener to infiltrate the P.I. crew to spy on Michael and the others and report back any information that he discovers. When Tweener fails to come up with anything Bellick deems as useful, he punishes Tweener by transferring him to a cell with a known rapist and ignores his pleas for help.

On the day of the breakout team's escape, Bellick is informed by Tweener that Michael and the rest of the P.I. crew are planning an escape, causing Bellick to discover the hole dug by Michael Scofield and the P.I. crew during their initial escape attempt. Before he can tell anyone, however, he is attacked, tied and gagged by Westmoreland, who is a member of the escape team, though Westmoreland received an injury during the struggle that proved fatal in the end. Bellick is trapped in the tunnels under the guard's room and has to witness the escape; after he is found in the season finale, Bellick swears revenge on the escapees and set out to catch them along with a team of other correctional officers.

Season 2 
Bellick continues to be a prominent character in the second season, but as his character adapts to the new format of the show he no longer only antagonizes Michael. With the main protagonists on the run and the plot shifting away from the prison, Bellick's central plotline becomes hunting the escapees in hopes of gaining reward money for their capture. In the premiere episode of the season, taking place in the morning after the escape, Bellick leads a manhunt of correctional officers in pursuit of the convicts. He is unsuccessful, however, and is soon called off the pursuit in favor of Special Agent Alexander Mahone and his team of FBI agents. In the next episode "Otis", a DOC conduct review board makes the decision to fire Bellick after his corruption is revealed. He prepares to commit suicide, but reconsiders after his mother informs him of the reward money for the escapees capture. He forms an unlikely alliance with former CO Roy Geary and becomes a bounty hunter. The next eleven episodes follow Bellick and Geary in their pursuit of the fugitives. Upon learning of the five million dollars Westmoreland buried in Utah, they set out to retrieve the money. They successfully track down Michael and his brother Lincoln Burrows by following Nika, but Bellick's stupidity allows him to be outwitted by the brothers in the next episode "First Down", in which Bellick's character plays a central role.

Bellick and Geary are absent for the next three episodes. They eventually re-appear in "Dead Fall", where they are able to surmise that T-Bag is in possession of Westmoreland's money. As T-Bag's subplot separates from the main plotline (which includes the protagonists fighting against the conspiracy) he begins to share scenes with Bellick and Geary in the next three episodes. After capturing T-bag in ”Rendezvous”, Bellick and Geary proceed to torture him to make him reveal the location of the money. In Bolshoi Booze, they discover a key hidden in his sock. The key leads them to a locker containing the five million dollars, but in one of the episode's twist endings Geary betrays Bellick, hitting him in the head with a meat tenderiser and steals the money. As Bellick recovers in the hospital in the next episode, he learns that T-Bag has killed Geary and taken back the money. Furthermore, Bellick himself becomes a suspect to Geary's murder, as T-bag manages to frame him. In the episode "Disconnect", Bellick appears in scenes with a female Kansas detective. After unsuccessfully trying to prove his innocence, Bellick is arrested for Geary's murder at the end of the episode. At the end of the fall finale, Bellick reluctantly accepts a deal of 25 years to avoid the death penalty and is sent to Fox River to begin serving his sentence. His last scene of the episode shows him in his cell in Gen Pop.

The character spends the next two episodes behind bars. As an inmate of Fox River, Bellick attempts to stay out of trouble but is bullied by the other inmates in the episode "John Doe", an inmate called Banks forces Bellick to bring him his dessert after meals, Bellick does this but Banks demands more from Bellick who subsequently attacks him and his entourage with a makeshift blackjack, he immediately is feared and respected by the other inmates because it appears that Banks is high up in the prison food chain. It is revealed in the episode ”The Message” that Banks and his crew have got their revenge on Bellick, because he has been brutally beaten overnight, he is also warned that there are many more beat downs to come. Bellick is deemed to be of some value to Agent Mahone, who secures his release from Fox River. Mahone, who is under blackmail by the sinister Company to ensure the deaths of the Fox River Eight, decides to use Bellick as his under-cover operative, without any paper-trail to connect him to Mahone. Bellick thus returns to his earlier subplot as a fugitive hunter. He immediately shows his worth by tracking down escapee Haywire in "Chicago." After being absent for one episode, Bellick then re-appears in "Wash" where he is assigned by Mahone to track down Sucre, which he does in the next episode. Learning that T-Bag still has the money, Bellick forces Sucre to help him track it down. Their plotline also intersects with Michael's in the penultimate episode "Fin Del Camino", as he also seeks to capture T-Bag. Bellick is later shot in the leg by T-Bag and then captured by Panama police. T-Bag again frames him for a murder, this time a Panamanian prostitute. In the season finale, Bellick is sent to the prison Penitenciaría Federal de Sona. In the last scene of the season, he is discovered by Michael at Sona prison, battered, and lying on the floor, under a bigger inmate.

Season 3
In Sona prison Bellick now finds himself on the lowest rung of prison society, forced to wear nothing but his underwear at all times and given the job to clean the prison's bathrooms and sewers. He eventually rises in the prison hierarchy, however, by informing Lechero, the ruler of the prison, of the mysterious Whistler's whereabouts. Convinced that Michael is planning another escape, Bellick then tries to force his way onto it. When this fails, he attempts to get Michael into trouble with Lechero. The plot backfires when Michael deflects Bellick's accusations, and Bellick ends up being scalded with hot coffée by Lechero as punishment for the "bad information."

Following the abuse, Bellick's character begins to show a more sympathetic side. In the episode "Interference", he tries to help the new outcast by giving him food. In the episode "Vamonos", he is deeply disturbed by the news of Sara's death, causing him to question his past actions. In the Episode "Boxed In" he is ordered to clean some vomit by one of Sammy's newly recruited goons. When he refuses the goon calls him to a chicken foot fight but Bellick defeats him by wrapping his hands in rags soaked in Acetone. When his adversary's senses are irritated because of the fumes, Bellick beats him to death. He consequently becomes very proud and popular in Sona and says he is Delta Force. When Sammy overthrows Lechero, T-Bag tells Bellick to chicken foot Sammy and in exchange he will be allowed to join the escape team. When Bellick discovers there is no more Acetone and Bellick is rapidly beaten by Sammy who was on the point of breaking his neck when he is called in by one of the goons. Despite his defeat he still joins the escape team. In ”Hell or High Water”, Bellick, T-Bag and Lechero are all tricked by Michael and get arrested by the guards while Michael and the rest of the team escape to safety. Following T-Bag's murder of Lechero and ascent to ruler of Sona in the episode ”The Art of the Deal”, a despairing Bellick is seen slumped down in defeat. The season ends with Bellick never getting out of Sona, sitting against a wall.

Season 4
In season 4, Bellick's character continues his redemption arc, and he now serves as an almost completely loyal ally to the protagonists. It is revealed in the first episode of season 4 that Sucre, T-Bag and Bellick have all broken out of Sona during a riot which led to the prison burning down. Later in the episode, Sucre and Bellick are both arrested when they arrive in Chicago. As Michael and Lincoln makes a deal with Homeland Security agent Don Self, Bellick and Sucre are recruited into Self's covert "A-Team" to bring down The Company. In the season's first eight episodes, Bellick has only a minor role, but provides crucial help in obtaining The Company's Scylla cards. He is often teamed up with Sucre, and the friendship the two developed while being in Sona is often referred to. In the ninth episode, Greatness Achieved, the character comes full circle. While digging their way to Scylla and trying to build a passage through a water conduct, the beam they are using to hold the pipe up breaks. Bellick, having stated earlier in the episode that his life has lacked purpose, decides to sacrifice himself to save the mission by climbing into the pipe and pulling the cylinder into place, trapping himself inside. He subsequently drowns. In "The Legend", his memory is honored by many of the other characters. Bellick is the fifth main character to be killed off in the series (after Veronica Donovan, John Abruzzi, Norman "Lechero" St. John, and James Whistler).

Personality and character transformation 

In seasons 1 and 2, Bellick was mean spirited and obnoxious, however after being put into Sona, his character softened. Wade Williams, who plays Bellick, has mentioned that "Like all guys with a big ego, Bellick probably has very low self-esteem." His tough guy act is little more than a facade and the slightest bit of real threat will quickly turn him into a quivering coward. When he felt secure behind his position as Captain of Fox River's correctional officers, however, Bellick made it a frequent habit to harass, intimidate and even threaten the lives of others. But in season 3, Bellick finally begins to learn and grow from the bully he had been in season 1 and 2. As the lowest part of the Sona pecking order, he goes through hell as all other inmates spit on him. This experience seems to change him.

In "Orientacion" the first episode of the third season, Bellick befriends another prisoner who is also an outcast. Later the man attempts to escape because he is afraid of starving to death since the other prisoners won't give him food. As he runs across "No man's land" he is shot dead, and Bellick is seen screaming in considerable emotional agony. In season 3's last episode "The Art of the Deal", he was scared and visibly shaken as he watched T-Bag smother Lechero with a pillow. When T-Bag asked him to help him rescue the wounded Lechero, who was being beaten up by an angry mob of prisoners he initially refused saying that "he could go to hell." Bellick was later seen slumped up against a wall.

In season 4, the character became more benevolent, actually taking Fernando Sucre along with him after Sona burned down. Bellick still retains some of his previous personality traits. He is extremely pessimistic, and is always voicing doubts about how they are going to be able to get the information they need to bring the Company down. He has even considered abandoning the rest of the group and fleeing to Mexico, only offering to bring Sucre along because "it would be nice to have someone who can speak the language." In the episode "Eagles and Angels," Bellick saves Lincoln's life when he was held at gunpoint by a Company Body Guard. Bellick stabs the man in the side with a screw driver, allowing Lincoln to escape and kill the assailant. Lincoln thanks Bellick for the rescue at the end of the episode, while Bellick seems to be shaken from the experience. In a later episode Bellick dies, while saving the mission to get Scylla. Lincoln and Bellick were trying to bridge a pipe across a main water conduit, but it was too heavy. Bellick heaved the pipe into position, refusing Lincoln's pleas to save himself. The pipe was hauled into place, sealing Bellick inside as the water pressure resumed. He subsequently drowned. In the following episode several main characters reminisce and mourn Bellick, including T-Bag, Sara, and Sucre. T-Bag, still masquerading as Cole Pfeiffer, actually delivers an indirect eulogy for Bellick, coining the phrase 'the captivity of negativity', citing the time Bellick spent inside of Fox River as a correctional officer. This may suggest that Brad's transformation of character may have had to do with the effects of his surroundings, from being an officer dealing with criminals, until his time as a rogue on a mission with the protagonists. In the episode The Legend, Sucre reveals that during his time in Sona, Bellick not only befriended him before the destruction of the prison and the escape, but actually saved his life. Sucre says that when T-Bag ordered the burning of the prison, the mob of prisoners nearly trampled him to death, in their mad frenzy to escape. Bellick at great personal risk to himself dragged him to safety.

It was also stated that Bellick had tried and failed to pass the police academy entrance exam five times. Before his body was sent home to his mother, Mahone placed a badge on his suit which he had acquired from the ball during the episode "Eagles and Angels".

References

Prison Break characters
Fictional American prison officers and governors
Fictional bounty hunters
Fictional characters from Illinois
Police misconduct in fiction
Television characters introduced in 2005
Fictional prison escapees
Fictional prisoners and detainees in the United States
Fictional suicides
Fictional torturers